Rhythmologa argentoviridana is a species of moth of the family Tortricidae. It is found in Carchi Province, Ecuador.

The wingspan is 24 mm. The ground colour of the forewings is silver white, suffused and strigulated (finely streaked) with greenish. The hindwings are pale brownish, but more cream basally.

Etymology
The species name refers to colouration of the forewings and is derived from Latin argenteus (meaning silver) and viridis (meaning green).

References

Moths described in 2008
Euliini